The 2017–18 season was Futbol Club Barcelona's 118th in existence and the club's 87th consecutive season in the top flight of Spanish football. This was also the first year under head coach Ernesto Valverde.

The team produced a solid season, clinching the domestic double, going undefeated in the league up until match day 37, where Barça lost to Levante 4–5, and producing an emphatic 5–0 victory over Sevilla in the Copa final. However, in the Champions League, Barcelona crashed out in the quarter-finals for the third year in a row, losing to Roma 0–3 and being eliminated on away goals as a result (after a 4–1 home victory). The season was the first since 2012–13 season without Neymar, who departed to join Paris Saint-Germain.

Season overview

May
On 29 May, the club announced Ernesto Valverde would be the new Barcelona coach following the departure of Luis Enrique at the end of the previous season.

On 29 May, Barcelona and goalkeeper Marc-André ter Stegen negotiated a five-year contract extension lasting until 30 June 2022.

June
On 14 June, Fluminense centre-back Marlon Santos signed a three-year contract.

On 30 June, goalkeeper Jordi Masip's contract expired; he was not resigned and was therefore released.

On 30 June, the club activated a buyback clause for Everton's Gerard Deulofeu.

On 30 June, the club announced they have reached an agreement with Real Betis for the transfer of Cristian Tello for €4 million.

July
On 7 July, Barcelona and Jérémy Mathieu agreed to mutually terminate the defender's contract. Mathieu subsequently joined Portuguese club Sporting CP on a free transfer.

On 13 July, Barcelona and Benfica reached an agreement for the transfer of right-back Nélson Semedo for €30 million.

On 21 July, Barcelona defeated Juventus 2–1 in a pre-season friendly. Neymar notched two impeccable first-half goals as the Catalans rolled past the Italian champions before 82,104 fans at a sold-out MetLife Stadium in the 2017 International Champions Cup. Giorgio Chiellini pulled one back for Juventus in the 63rd minute, not enough to keep the Ernesto Valverde era from beginning with a convincing win.

On 26 July, Barcelona won 1–0 against Manchester United in a pre-season friendly. Neymar scored in the 31st minute.

On 29 July, Barcelona defeated Real Madrid 3–2 in their final match of the U.S. tour, winning the United States edition of the 2017 International Champions Cup. Messi, Ivan Rakitić and Gerard Piqué each scored one goal.

August
On 3 August, Barcelona confirmed the unilateral termination of Neymar's contract as Neymar's legal representatives paid his €222 million buyout clause. In turn, Barcelona announced a turnover of operation details to UEFA so as to allow UEFA to determine any disciplinary responsibilities that may arise. Neymar subsequently joined Paris Saint-Germain on a five-year contract.

On 4 August, Barcelona drew 1–1 with Gimnàstic in a pre-season friendly game in Tarragona. Manu Barreiro put the hosts ahead in the 11th minute only for Paco Alcácer to score the equalizer for the Blaugrana from a free-kick in the 79th minute.

On 7 August, Barcelona defeated Chapecoense 5–0 in the 52nd edition of the Joan Gamper Trophy. Gerard Deulofeu, Sergio Busquets, Messi, Luis Suárez and Denis Suárez were the scorers for Barça; Messi and Deulofeu also assisted two goals each. Busquets was named the Man of the Match.

On 13 August, Barcelona lost 1–3 to Real Madrid in the first leg of the 2017 Supercopa de España. The first half of the match ended goalless. Five minutes into the second half, Marcelo fired a cross that deflected off Piqué's foot, resulting in an own goal. In the 77th minute, Luis Suárez was brought down in the box by goalkeeper Keylor Navas, resulting in a penalty which was converted by Lionel Messi. Messi's hit marked his 25th goal in the fixture. In the 80th minute, Real Madrid scored their second through a counterattack when Isco assisted Cristiano Ronaldo, who shot into the top right corner from the edge of the box. Ronaldo was booked for removing his shirt as part of his celebrations. Two minutes later, he was booked again for a dive in the penalty box, which resulted in a red card and a subsequent suspension for the second leg. Real's last goal was scored in the 90th minute in similar fashion to the second, when Marco Asensio shot into the top left corner following an assist from Lucas Vázquez.

On 14 August, Barcelona announced they had reached an agreement with Guangzhou Evergrande Taobao for the transfer of Paulinho for €40 million. His release clause was set at €120 million.

On 16 August, Barcelona lost 2–0 (agg. 1–5) to Real Madrid in the second leg of the 2017 Supercopa de España. The first goal of the match came quite early through a Real throw-in the fourth minute which resulted into getting the ball to Marco Asensio, who scored from long range. Nine minutes after the half-hour mark, Marcelo crossed in for Karim Benzema to control, who finished it with a half-volley into the net which was enough for the win for Real.

On 20 August, Barcelona defeated Real Betis 2–0 in their first Liga match of the season, following an own goal from Alin Toșca and a second within three minutes by Sergi Roberto.

On 24 August, Barcelona confirmed the transfer of Sergi Samper to Las Palmas on a season-long loan.

On 25 August, Barcelona announced they had reached an agreement with Borussia Dortmund for the transfer of Ousmane Dembélé for €105 million plus add-ons. The player signed a five-year contract and his buyout clause was set at €400 million.

On 26 August, Barcelona defeated Alavés 0–2 at Mendizorrotza. Messi scored both goals, although having a penalty saved by Pacheco. Paulinho made his debut for Barcelona.

On 29 August, Nice and Barcelona reached an agreement for the loan of Marlon for two years, with a buy-back option for Barcelona after the first year.

On 31 August, Barcelona and Benfica reached an agreement for the loan of Douglas until the end of the 2017–18 campaign.

September
On 1 September, Barcelona and Alavés reached an agreement for the loan of Munir until the end of the 2017–18 campaign.

On 5 September, midfielder Carles Aleñá signed a new contract, keeping him at the club for a further three years with an optional extra two years.

On 9 September, Barcelona defeated Espanyol 5–0 in the Derbi barceloní. Messi scored a hat-trick while Piqué and Suárez topped off the scoring. Ousmane Dembélé made his debut, coming on as a substitute for Gerard Deulofeu in the 68th minute; he set Suárez up for the final goal.

On 12 September, Barcelona beat Juventus 3–0 in their first game of the 2017–18 UEFA Champions League, following a brace by Messi and another goal by Rakitić.

On 16 September, Barcelona defeated Getafe 1–2 in a hard-fought game at the Coliseum Alfonso Pérez. Shibasaki scored a stunning goal for Getafe in the first half while both of Barcelona's goals came in the second half from substitutes Denis Suárez and Paulinho, the latter of whom scored his maiden Barcelona goal.

On 19 September, Barcelona defeated Eibar 6–1, with Messi scoring four and Paulinho and Denis Suárez getting the other goals. Eibar's only goal was scored by Sergi Enrich.

On 23 September, Barcelona defeated Girona 0–3 in their first ever Catalan derby. Girona captain Aday and goalkeeper Iraizoz inadvertently steered the ball into their own net to give Barcelona a two-goal lead, before Luis Suárez topped off the scoring.

On 27 September, Barcelona defeated Sporting Lisbon 0–1 on the 2nd matchday of the Champions League, at the Estádio José Alvalade. Barça were dependent on a lone own goal by Sebastián Coates.

October
On 1 October, Barcelona defeated Las Palmas 3–0 in a game played behind closed doors at the Camp Nou, due to violence in Catalonia relating to an ongoing independence referendum. Sergio Busquets scored through a header, while Messi topped off the scoring with a brace. Prior to the game, two directors, Jordi Monés and Carles Vilarrubí, handed in their resignations in protest to the game being played.

On 3 October, Barcelona joined the country-wide strike called by ‘Taula per la Democràcia’ (Table for Democracy) and therefore the club offices remained closed. None of the professional teams nor the youth teams at FC Barcelona trained. The Tour Camp Nou Experience and the Museum as well as the OAB were also closed.

On 6 October, midfielder Andrés Iniesta signed a lifetime contract with Barcelona, keeping him with the club for the remainder of his career.

On 14 October, Barcelona were held by Atlético Madrid to a 1–1 draw at the Wanda Metropolitano, which effectively ended their winning streak. Saúl scored early into the game to give Atlético the lead, but Luis Suárez saved Barça's day with a last-gasp header.

On 18 October, Barcelona won against Olympiacos 3–1 at home. The Catalans maintained a perfect start thanks to an early own-goal, Messi's 100th European goal, and one from Digne, although the visitors did pull one back at the last minute. Barcelona had a goal ruled for offside and one deemed to have touched Piqué's hand and entered the net, resulting in his second yellow of the night, and his suspension for the return game.

On 21 October, table-toppers Barcelona defeated winless Málaga 2–0 at home. Deulofeu controversially grabbed an early goal, while Iniesta added a second later in the final half.

On 24 October, Barcelona defeated Real Murcia 3–0 in their Copa del Rey opener. Paco Alcácer scored a header just before the break, while Deulofeu scored in the second half and Barça B youngster José Arnaiz quickly added the third on his debut with the first team.

On 28 October, Barcelona won against Athletic Bilbao 0–2 away at the Nuevo San Mamés. Goals from Messi and Paulinho split the teams in Bilbao to ensure the Catalans stay four points clear at the top of the Liga table.

On 31 October, Barcelona were held by Olympiacos to a goal-less draw at the Karaiskakis Stadium in Piraeus.

November
On 4 November, Barcelona defeated Sevilla at a rainy night at the Camp Nou. Paco Alcácer opened the scoring with a goal early in the game, while Pizarro headed in the equaliser in the second half, Alcácer netted his second and also the match deciding goal few minutes later.

On 18 November, Barcelona won against Leganés 0–3 at the Estadio Municipal de Butarque. Suárez ended his 5-game goalless streak with two strikes from rebounds, while Paulinho added the final touch. Piqué received his 5th yellow card of the season, meaning he misses Barça's next match.

On 22 November, Barcelona were held to a 0–0 draw against Juventus at the Allianz Stadium, thereby qualifying for the Round of 16 of the Champions League.

On 25 November, Messi signed a new deal with Barcelona, keeping him with the club till the end of the 2020/21 season. His buyout clause was set at €700 million.

On 26 November, Barcelona tied with Valencia at the Mestalla Stadium. A Messi shot was dropped into the goal by Neto, but was disallowed by the referee. In the second half, Rodrigo put Valencia in the lead, but Jordi Alba scored through a Messi assist in the dying minutes.

On 29 November, Barcelona thrashed Real Murcia 5–0 (agg. 8–0) at the Camp Nou. Paco Alcácer, Piqué, Aleix Vidal, Denis Suárez and José Arnaiz, were the scorers.

December
On 2 December, Barcelona were held to a 2–2 draw by Celta Vigo at the Camp Nou. Iago Aspas scored at the 20-minute mark, but Messi equalized within a few minutes. Luis Suárez put Barça in the lead in the second half, but again, the score was equalized by Maxi Gómez.

On 5 December, Barcelona defeated Sporting Lisbon 2–0, with a goal from a Paco Alcácer header, and an own goal from ex-Barça player Jérémy Mathieu.

On 10 December, Barcelona won against Villarreal 0–2 at Estadio de la Cerámica. Both goals came late into the game, with one each scored by Messi and Suárez. Villarreal's Raba got a direct red for a challenge on Sergio. Messi's goal equalled the record in Europe's major leagues of the Bayern Munich striker Gerd Müller with 525 goals with one club.

On 17 December, Barcelona won against La Coruña 4–0, Suárez and Paulinho scored two goals each on a fabulous night for both.

On 23 December, Barcelona defeated Real Madrid 0–3 at the Bernabéu. Suárez, Messi and Aleix Vidal each scored a goal that saw the Blaugrana head into the Christmas break 14 points clear of the defending champions.

January
On 4 January, Barcelona were held to a 1–1 draw by Celta Vigo. A gripping cup first leg ended at Balaídos all square on the night that Ousmane Dembélé made his long-awaited return from injury.

On 6 January, Barcelona announced that they had reached an agreement with Liverpool for the transfer of Philippe Coutinho. The player signed a contract for the remainder of the season and five more, and has a buyout clause of €400 million.

On 7 January, Barcelona won against Levante 3–0, Ernesto Valverde's men kicked off the New Year in La Liga with an impressive team performance and goals from Messi, Suárez and Paulinho.

On 11 January, Barcelona and Sociedade Esportiva Palmeiras reached an agreement for the transfer of Yerry Mina for the remainder of the season and five more until June 30, 2023. The cost of the transfer was €11.8 million and his release clause was set at €100 million.

On 11 January, Barcelona defeated Celta Vigo 5–0 (agg. 6–1) at the Camp Nou. Four goals in the first 31 minutes (2 from Messi and one each from Jordi Alba and Luis Suárez) got the job done early and Rakitic headed in a late fifth as the Catalans cruised into the quarter-finals of the Copa del Rey.

On 13 January, Barcelona and İstanbul Başakşehir F.K. agreed on a loan deal for Turkish midfielder Arda Turan for the remainder of the season and two more.

On 14 January, Barcelona defeated Real Sociedad away at the Anoeta Stadium with a score of 2–4. This was the first time Barça beat La Real away since May 2007. Barça were 2–0 down at the 35th minute, until Paulinho scored Barça's first in the 39th minute. Suárez scored in the 50th and 71st minute, and Messi scored a free kick in the 85th minute to complete the comeback.

On 17 January, Barcelona was defeated by Espanyol 1–0 away. Barça dominated in Cornellà but failed to find the net as the home side snatched a winner three minutes from the end.

On 19 January, Barcelona and Sergi Roberto reached an agreement to renew his contract through to 30 June 2022.

On 21 January, Barcelona beat Real Betis 0–5 away at the Estadio Benito Villamarín. Valverde's men won in style with five second-half goals within 30 minutes as Rakitic, Messi (2), and Suárez (2) all found the net.

On 22 January, Barcelona announced that they had reached an agreement with Inter Milan for the loan of Rafinha until 30 June 2018. Inter has an option to purchase the player for €35M+€3M euros in variables, which must be confirmed before the end of the current season.

On 25 January, Barcelona defeated Espanyol 2–0 (agg. 2–1) at home. Philippe Coutinho's debut, and goals from Lionel Messi and Luis Suárez brought the Camp Nou to its feet as Barça reached the semi-finals of the Copa del Rey.

On 28 January, Barcelona beat Alavés 2–1 at home. Barça equaled a club record by going unbeaten in first 21 league games of the season thanks to a second half comeback win with goals from Suárez and Messi.

On 29 January, Gerard Piqué renewed his contract through to 30 June 2022.

February
On 1 February, Barcelona defeated Valencia 1–0 at the Camp Nou. A Luis Suárez header broke the deadlock in a frustrating encounter.

On 4 February, Barcelona were held by Espanyol to a 1–1 draw away at the RCDE Stadium. Gerard Moreno's opener was cancelled out by a towering header from Gerard Piqué in a torrential downpour. This draw marked the 22nd consecutive unbeaten game in the league for Barcelona, which is a new club record, beating the previous record of 21 games under Pep Guardiola in the 2009–10 season.

On 8 February, Barcelona defeated Valencia 0–2 (0-3 on aggregate) at the Mestalla. Coutinho claimed first goal in a blaugrana jersey and Rakitic added a second to send the Catalans into the Copa del Rey final against Sevilla on April 21

On 11 February, Barcelona drew with Getafe 0–0 at the Camp Nou. The Blaugranas couldn't break down the team from Madrid's resolute defending in a hard-fought game with few clear-cut chances.

On 17 February, Barcelona beat Eibar 0–2 at Ipurua. Goals from Luis Suárez and Jordi Alba secured three hard-earned points in the Basque Country to match the Club record unbeaten run in La Liga.

On 20 February, Barcelona drew with Chelsea 1–1 at Stamford Bridge. Iniesta-Messi connection canceled out Willian's opener to set up an enticing second leg at Camp Nou in three weeks' time.

On 24 February, Barcelona defeated Girona 6–1 at the Camp Nou. A hat-trick from Suárez, two goals from Messi plus a Coutinho special helped Barça to an exciting win over an opponent who took the lead and were always willing to get forward themselves.

March
On 1 March, Barcelona were held by Las Palmas to a 1–1 draw away from home. A wondrous Messi free kick puts the Catalans in command but the Islanders leveled up from the spot.

On 4 March, Barcelona won against Atlético Madrid 1–0 at home. Another Lionel Messi special was enough for Barça to see off determined opponents who fought for the win right to the very end.

On 7 March, Barcelona defeated Espanyol at the Camp d'Esports in Lleida. The third edition of the Supercopa de Catalunya went down to penalties in Lleida, and the Blaugrana made no mistake and brought the trophy home.

On 10 March, Barcelona won against Málaga 0–2 away. Fabulous first half goals from Suárez and Coutinho were enough to secure a comfortable victory in a top-against-bottom clash.

On 11 March, FC Barcelona confirmed that an agreement had been reached with Grêmio for the purchase option of Brazilian midfielder Arthur. If Barcelona exercises the option in July 2018, the transfer will cost €30m plus €9m in added variables.

On 14 March, Barcelona won against Chelsea 3–0 (agg. 4–1). Dembélé notched his debut goal and Messi scored his 99th and 100th career Champions League goals as Barça went through to the last eight for a record-extending 11th straight season.

On 18 March, Barcelona defeated Athletic Bilbao 2–0 at the Camp Nou. A scintillating first-half display from the Blaugranes secured a comfortable 2–0 win with goals from Alcácer and Messi at the Camp Nou.

On 31 March, Barcelona recorded a heart-stopping 2–2 draw at the Ramón Sánchez Pizjuán. Two late goals from Luis Suárez and Lionel Messi earned a draw for Barça after Sevilla had opened up a two-goal lead through Franco Vázquez and Luis Muriel.

April
On 4 April, Barça took a 4–1 aggregate lead into the second leg after two own goals by Roma and a third from Gerard Piqué; Edin Dzeko answered for Roma before Luis Suárez added some late insurance.

On 7 April, Barca defeated Leganes 3–1 drawing level with the joint-record of 38 unbeaten games set by Real Sociedad, thanks to a Messi hat-trick.

On 10 April, Barça lost 3–0 to Roma. Goals from Džeko, De Rossi and Manolas allowed the Italians to turn around a three-goal deficit and qualify for the semi-finals on the away goals rule.

On 14 April, Barca defeated València 2–1 with goals from Luis Suárez and Samuel Umtiti that secured the longest unbeaten streak (39) in La Liga history.

On 17 April, ten-man Barça held on for a 2–2 draw with Celta Vigo at Balaídos. Ousmane Dembélé scored his first La Liga goal and Paco Alcácer got the other. Sergi Roberto was sent off in the 71st minute but Barca held on to remain unbeaten in the league.

On 21 April, Barcelona cruised to their fourth consecutive Copa del Rey title as they beat Sevilla 5–0 at the Wanda Metropolitano. The goals were scored by Luis Suarez (2), Messi, Iniesta and Coutinho.

On 27 April, Andrés Iniesta announced that he would be leaving the club at the end of the season after 22 incredible years. Iniesta, a World Cup winner with Spain, won nine La Liga titles alongside four Champions League wins and six Copa del Rey crowns.

On 29 April, Barcelona defeated Deportivo La Coruna 4–2 to win their 25th La Liga title. Coutinho scored the opening goal before Messi sealed the title with a hat trick.

May
On 6 May, 10-man Barcelona held on for a dramatic 2–2 draw in El Clasico against Real Madrid to extend their unbeaten streak in the league. Luis Suarez and Leo Messi scored the goals for Barca which were cancelled out by goals from Cristiano Ronaldo and Gareth Bale. Sergi Roberto was sent off in first-half injury time following an altercation with Marcelo.

On 9 May, a much changed Barcelona side defeated Villareal 5–1. Barca's new signings Coutinho, Paulinho and Dembele (2) were all on target with Messi getting the other goal.

On 13 May, Barcelona's unbeaten run came to the end when they lost to Levante 4–5. Barcelona mounted a spirited comeback after trailing 1–5 but fell agonizingly short. The only bright spot in the game was a hat-trick by Philippe Coutinho. The other goal was scored by Luis Suarez from the penalty spot.

On 20 May, Barcelona defeated Real Sociedad 1–0 in Iniesta's final game as a Barcelona player. The only goal of the game was a breathtaking strike from Iniesta's heir apparent – Coutinho. Iniesta received a standing ovation from the Camp Nou when he was substituted in the 82nd minute. This game also marked the last appearance for Real Sociedad legend Xabi Prieto.

Kit

Players

Squad information

From youth squad

Players in

Total spending:  €323.8 million

Players out

Total income:  €231.5 million

Net:  €92.3 million

Notes

Statistics

Squad appearances and goals
Last updated on 27 May 2018.

|-
! colspan=14 style=background:#dcdcdc; text-align:center|Goalkeepers

|-
! colspan=14 style=background:#dcdcdc; text-align:center|Defenders

|-
! colspan=14 style=background:#dcdcdc; text-align:center|Midfielders

|-
! colspan=14 style=background:#dcdcdc; text-align:center|Forwards

|-
! colspan=14 style=background:#dcdcdc; text-align:center| Players who have made an appearance or had a squad number this season but have left the club

|-
|}

Squad statistics
{|class="wikitable" style="text-align: center;"
|-
!
! style="width:70px;"|League
! style="width:70px;"|Europe
! style="width:70px;"|Cup
! style="width:70px;"|Others
! style="width:70px;"|Total Stats
|-
|align=left|Games played       || 38 || 10 || 9 || 2 || 59
|-
|align=left|Games won          || 28 || 6 || 7 || 0 || 41
|-
|align=left|Games drawn        || 9 || 3 || 1 || 0 || 13
|-
|align=left|Games lost         || 1 || 1 || 1 || 2 || 5
|-
|align=left|Goals scored       || 99 || 17 || 24 || 1 || 141
|-
|align=left|Goals conceded     || 29 || 6 || 2 || 5 || 42
|-
|align=left|Goal difference    || 70 || 11 || 22 || -4 || 99
|-
|align=left|Clean sheets       || 19 || 6 || 6 || 0 || 31
|-
|align=left|Goal by Substitute || 5 || 0 || 2 || 0 || 7
|-
|align=left|Total shots        || – || – || – || –|| –
|-
|align=left|Shots on target    || – || – || – || –|| –
|-
|align=left|Corners            || – || – || – || –|| –
|-
|align=left|Players used       || – || – || – || –|| –
|-
|align=left|Offsides           || – || – || – || –|| –
|-
|align=left|Fouls suffered     || – || – || – || –|| –
|-
|align=left|Fouls committed    || – || – || – || –|| –
|-
|align=left|Yellow cards       || 66 || 21 || 11 || 5 || 103
|-
|align=left|Red cards          || 2 || 1 || 0 || 0 || 3
|-

Players Used: Barcelona has used a total of – different players in all competitions.

Goalscorers

Last updated: 9 May 2018

Hat-tricks

(H) – Home; (A) – Away

Clean sheets
Last updated on 17 April 2018.

Disciplinary record

Includes all competitive matches. Players listed below (excluding goalkeepers) made at least one appearance for Barcelona first squad during the season.

Injury record

Pre-season and friendlies

International Champions Cup

Friendlies

Joan Gamper Trophy

Supercopa de Catalunya

Competitions

Overview

La Liga

Standings

Results summary

Results by round

Matches

Copa del Rey

Round of 32

Round of 16

Quarter-finals

Semi-finals

Final

Supercopa de España

UEFA Champions League

Group stage

Knockout phase

Round of 16

Quarter-finals

References
Notes

Citations

External links

FC Barcelona seasons
2017–18 La Liga
Barcelona
Barcelona
Barcelona
Spanish football championship-winning seasons